The 1980–81 Scottish Second Division was won by Queen's Park who, along with second placed Queen of the South, were promoted to the First Division. Stranraer finished bottom.

Table

References 

Scottish Second Division seasons
3
Scot